WAND (channel 17) is a television station licensed to Decatur, Illinois, United States, serving the Central Illinois region as an affiliate of NBC. Owned by Block Communications, the station maintains studios on South Side Drive in Decatur, and its transmitter is located along I-72, between Oreana and Argenta.

Channel 17 was the first station built in the market, signing on as WTVP on August 16, 1953. Originally an affiliate of ABC, it was owned by local non-broadcast investors and struggled from its impaired reach. Investments were made in facilities and programming under Metromedia in the early 1960s, but it was as the first television station property owned by LIN Broadcasting that the station activated a more powerful transmitter facility and changed its call sign to WAND in 1966. The tower collapsed in a 1978 ice storm and was not rebuilt for more than a year, hindering the station's reach.

LIN sold majority ownership to Block Communications in 2000, but it continued to operate the station until Block purchased the remainder in 2007. During that time, WAND switched affiliations from ABC to NBC as part of a new group affiliation agreement between LIN and NBC. The station has generally been preferred by news viewers in the area in and around Decatur, but in the fragmented media market, it generally runs third behind the stations in the more populous Champaign and Springfield areas.

History

WTVP: Early years
Decatur was assigned two channels, 17 and 23 in the ultra high frequency (UHF) band, when the Federal Communications Commission (FCC) lifted its four-year freeze on TV station grants in 1952. While Decatur radio stations WSOY and WDZ announced plans to apply, neither had done so by October 1952, when the Prairie Television Company applied for channel 17. Its president was W. L. Shellabarger, who had previously led a soy mill company. The commission quickly issued Prairie a construction permit on November 20.

Construction began on a facility south of the city along the Sangamon River, including an interim transmitter facility (a 1-kilowatt transmitter was all that was available, leaving a 10-kilowatt unit to be installed at a later date) Fabrication of the station's transmitting antenna had become the principal obstacle to going on the air by the start of July, with eight changes in the promised shipping date from the manufacturer, RCA. Even while construction was drawing to a close, issues were emerging involving another station planning to get on the air: WCIA (channel 3) of Champaign, which had hoped to move its transmitter slightly to the east and improve its coverage of Decatur. WTVP contended that WCIA's proposed relocation had hampered its efforts to obtain a network affiliation, even though it had announced plans months earlier to affiliate with CBS, WCIA-TV wound up with that affiliation.

The antenna arrived in Decatur and was erected on August 2; 10,000 people turned out at the studios for a previously scheduled open house and to see the antenna hoisted atop the  tower. The first test pattern went out two days later, and WTVP began telecasting on August 16, 1953. The station was a primary affiliate of ABC, though in the first months, programming from all the major networks was shown.

Months after going on the air, the station was roiled by a management crisis. On January 20, 1954, the station failed to broadcast, and three executives—the general manager, chief engineer, and program director—resigned instead of complying with an ultimatum from owner Shellabarger. A total of 20 employees resigned, all of them identically claiming "an unstable administrative situation" and "proposed changes in program policy". The main issue, it turned out, was that the station had 47 employees, more than comparable stations in central Illinois. One of the departing executives, Harold Cowgill, went as far as to announce his intention to apply for channel 23 so as to compete with WTVP.

WTVP also had to contend with the uneven structure of television in Central Illinois. WCIA, as a VHF station, had a larger coverage area, better ratings and more advertiser support than WTVP, WICS in Springfield, or other UHF outlets. Shortly after WTVP and WICS failed at the end of 1957 in their joint bid to force WCIA to move to a UHF channel, in April 1958, Shellabarger sold controlling interest in the station to a group of Chicago businessmen. Several members of the Swanson family were also represented in the ownership.

Metromedia ownership
The start of the 1960s would bring another change in ownership to WTVP. In January 1960, Prairie Television announced the sale of the station to Metropolitan Broadcasting of New York City. This company renamed itself Metromedia in 1961. The $570,000 purchase of the station was a near-tripling of its value in two years.

Under Metromedia, some operations of the station were shared with WTVH in Peoria, including senior leadership. Metromedia purchased the first video tape recorder at a central Illinois TV station for WTVP in 1961, and it also applied for and built a translator to extend its signal into the Champaign–Urbana area. It then worked to make the translator a moot point by filing in 1964 for a power increase for channel 17, which had never operated at its full authorized effective radiated power since beginning broadcasting.

WAND: LIN ownership
Metromedia grew rapidly during the time it owned WTVP, and it began to signal that it wanted to shed its Illinois stations in pursuit of larger markets. In March 1965, it sold WTVH in Peoria to make room for the potential acquisition of a major-market UHF outlet. In October, it announced the $2 million sale of WTVP to LIN Broadcasting Company of Nashville, Tennessee; LIN operated four Southern radio stations and a series of cable television systems but no TV stations. As the WTVP sale awaited FCC approval, Metromedia was already negotiating to acquire a UHF station in San Francisco.

Nearly immediately after the FCC approved the transfer of ownership to LIN, it announced its plan for changes: a power increase, increased local programming, and new WAND call letters. The call sign changed on February 15, and other changes came throughout the year, including expanded news coverage. In July, ground was broken on a new transmitter facility at a site near Argenta, which was put into service that October; the  mast and 1,950,000-watt signal improved regional coverage. It also required some viewers in the Decatur area to buy a second antenna to clearly receive WAND alongside other stations.

On March 26, 1978, WAND's tower was brought down by a massive ice storm, narrowly missing a house. All but  of the tower fell down under the weight of massive sheets of ice. The lost tower was worth $1.5 million. To restore service, WAND began to prepare its original transmitter facility to be reactivated. A temporary antenna allowed the station to get back on the air on April 3. This did not reach the Champaign–Urbana area, so WAND temporarily relocated its translator at Danville to Champaign, meaning the former city would have to go without ABC programs for months while the Argenta tower was rebuilt.

Block ownership; affiliation switch to NBC
LIN wholly owned WAND until March 2000 when it sold 67 percent of the station to current owner Block Communications in exchange for 100 percent of WLFI-TV in Lafayette, Indiana. However, LIN continued to own a third of WAND and operate the station as part of the deal and did not sell the remaining stake to Block until November 2007. The continued LIN connection would have a material impact. In 2004, NBC and LIN negotiated a new affiliation agreement that included clauses for switching two LIN-operated ABC affiliates to NBC: WAND and WDTN in Dayton, Ohio. At the time, NBC had higher ratings. As a result, on September 5, 2005, WAND became an NBC affiliate, with WICS/WICD switching to ABC.

News operation
The Central Illinois media market, fragmented between stations in multiple cities, is one where news viewership has typically been divided among city lines. This dynamic also holds for WAND. For instance, in November 1996, 25 percent of viewers in a seven-county area around Decatur watched WAND's 6 p.m. newscast; however, in the full market, it was a distant third behind WCIA and WICS/WICD with just 8.5 percent of the audience.

The 1990s were a decade of news department expansion at WAND. The station's only full-length newscasts were at 6 and 10 p.m. newscasts until 1992, when WAND debuted Live at Five, the second 5 p.m. newscast in the area. Its launch was brought forward by five months to cover a five-month strike against Caterpillar Inc.. In late 1993, a Doppler weather radar was installed atop the station's building in Decatur; the purchase, made by LIN as part of a push to add radar at all of its stations, represented the first Doppler radar in the local area. The 20-minute Good Morning Central Illinois shifted from 20 minutes to an hour in 1994. However, WAND was the last of the three major stations to only run an hour-long morning newscast as WCIA and WICS each extended their morning newscasts to start earlier than 6 a.m.

In 2009, WAND became the first station in the market to air a half-hour newscast on weekday afternoons at 4:30. This was made possible due to the cancellation of Deal or No Deal. WAND immediately aired its 5 p.m. newscast making a full hour of local news. In July 2011, WAND moved its 4:30 p.m. show up to 4 and moved Jeopardy! back to its original spot at 4:30. On January 27, 2014, WAND expanded its weekday noon broadcast to one hour. 2018 saw the introduction of weekend morning newscasts.

Notable current on-air staff
Jim Kosek — meteorologist

Notable former on-air staff
Grant Napear — sports anchor, 1984–1987
Devin Scillian — reporter and anchor

Technical information

Subchannels
The station's signal is multiplexed:

WAND hosts a subchannel of WRSP-TV and is in turn hosted in ATSC 3.0 (NextGen TV) as part of the market's ATSC 3.0 (NextGen TV) deployment, which launched in December 2022.

Analog-to-digital conversion
WAND shut down its analog signal, over UHF channel 17, on February 17, 2009, the original target date in which full-power television stations in the United States were to transition from analog to digital broadcasts under federal mandate (which was pushed back to June 12, 2009). The station's digital signal remained on its pre-transition UHF channel 18, using virtual channel 17. On June 6, 2011, the FCC granted WAND a construction permit to move its digital frequency back to channel 17 with the UHF digital maximum power of one million watts.

WAND relocated its signal from channel 17 to channel 20 on January 17, 2020, as a result of the 2016 United States wireless spectrum auction.

Translators
In addition to its main signal, WAND can also be seen on three low-power translators:

 Danville: W23EQ-D
 Effingham: W33EK-D
 Jacksonville: W29ES-D

See also
Channel 20 digital TV stations in the United States
Channel 17 virtual TV stations in the United States

Notes

References

External links

Television channels and stations established in 1953
Companies based in Macon County, Illinois
1953 establishments in Illinois
AND
NBC network affiliates
Cozi TV affiliates
Ion Television affiliates
Defy TV affiliates
Scripps News affiliates
MeTV affiliates
Metromedia
Decatur, Illinois